Nadia Hilou (‎; 5 July 1953 – 27 February 2015) was an Arab-Israeli social worker and politician, who served as a member of the Knesset for the Labor Party between 2006 and 2009. She was the second female Israeli Arab MK after Hussniya Jabara, and also the first female Christian MK.

Biography
Hilou was born in Jaffa, Israel, to Christian Arab parents. She studied at Tel Aviv University where she gained a BA in social work in 1976. She later returned to qualify for an MA in the same subject. In 1997, she became director of the Division for the Status of Women in the Union of local authorities, and in 2002 became deputy chairwoman of the Na'amat Women's Organisation.

Hilou entered politics following the assassination of Yitzhak Rabin in 1995. She joined the Labour Party, and ran in party primaries prior to the Knesset elections in 1996 and 1999; however, on both occasions she failed to finish high enough up the list to win a seat, and was criticised for not joining one of the Arab parties. However, in the run-up to the 2006 elections Hilou won 15th place (a slot reserved for women) on Labour's list in the party's primaries. The party won 19 seats and Hilou took her place in the Knesset, relinquishing her previous positions. She served as chair of the Committee on the Rights of the Child. One of her first acts was to co-sponsor a successful bill strengthening laws against cyber sex with minors. She has also initiated legislation on compensating the relatives of murder victims.

In 2007, she voiced a complaint about the treatment of her children at Ben-Gurion Airport by security staff, saying that their treatment was "humiliating." She lost her seat in the 2009 elections.

In 2013, her autobiography, titled The Pioneer from Ajami, was published in Hebrew by HaKibbutz HaMeuhad Press.

Hilou lived in Jaffa, and died in February 2015 from cancer. She was survived by a husband and four daughters, Natali, Cristina, Rola and Rena.

Bibliography
Poretzet HaDerekh MiAjami (The Trailblazer from Ajami), HaKibbutz HaMeuhad, 2013

See also
Women in Israel

References

External links

1953 births
2015 deaths
Place of death missing
21st-century Israeli women politicians
Arab members of the Knesset
Deaths from cancer in Israel
Israeli Arab Christians
Israeli autobiographers
Israeli Labor Party politicians
Israeli social workers
Members of the 17th Knesset (2006–2009)
People from Jaffa
Politicians from Tel Aviv
Tel Aviv University alumni
Women autobiographers
Women members of the Knesset